Thomaston is a city in and the county seat of Upson County, Georgia, United States. The population was 9,170 at the 2010 census. It is the principal city of and is included in the Thomaston, Georgia Micropolitan Statistical Area, which is included in the Atlanta - Sandy Springs (GA) - Gainesville (GA) - Alabama (partial) Combined Statistical Area.

History
  Thomaston was incorporated on January 1, 1825, and designated as the seat of Upson County. The town was named for General Jett Thomas, an Indian fighter in the War of 1812.

Geography

Thomaston is located near the center of Upson County at 32.90 N, -84.333333 W (32° 54′ 0″ N, 84° 20′ 0″ W). The city is located in the west central Piedmont region of the state.

U.S. Route 19 is the main north-south route through the city, leading north 16 mi (26 km) to Zebulon and south 28 mi (45 km) to Butler. Georgia State Routes 36 and 74 are the main east-west routes through the city. GA-36 leads northeast 17 mi (27 km) to Barnesville and southwest 18 mi (29 km) to Woodland. GA-74 leads east 12 mi (19 km) to Yatesville and northwest 19 mi (31 km) to Woodbury.

Demographics

2020 census

As of the 2020 United States census, there were 9,816 people, 3,333 households, and 1,779 families residing in the city.

2000 census
As of the census of 2000, there were 9,411 people, 3,862 households, and 2,386 families residing in the city. The racial makeup of the city was 62.75% White, 35.30% African American, 0.28% Native American, 0.61% Asian, 0.01% Pacific Islander, 0.53% from other races, and 0.53% from two or more races. Hispanic or Latino of any race were 1.77% of the population.

There were 3,862 households, out of which 28.2% had children under the age of 18 living with them, 37.0% were married couples living together, 21.4% had a female householder with no husband present, and 38.2% were non-families. 35.2% of all households were made up of individuals, and 17.8% had someone living alone who was 65 years of age or older. The average household size was 2.33 and the average family size was 3.00.

In the city, the population was spread out, with 25.3% under the age of 18, 8.4% from 18 to 24, 25.9% from 25 to 44, 19.8% from 45 to 64, and 20.6% who were 65 years of age or older. The median age was 38 years. For every 100 females, there were 77.4 males. For every 100 females age 18 and over, there were 71.3 males.

The median income for a household in the city was $24,695, and the median income for a family was $33,093. Males had a median income of $31,168 versus $20,420 for females. The per capita income for the city was $18,193. About 18.4% of families and 22.5% of the population were below the poverty line, including 37.3% of those under age 18 and 13.9% of those age 65 or over.

Health care
Its principal hospital is the Upson Regional Medical Center at 801 West Gordon Street.

Industry

Industry in the city is driven primarily by manufacturing which makes up 36.5%. The second largest industry is educational, health, and social service comprising 21.0%. The third largest industry is retail trade at 11.6% of the total industry in Thomaston. The remaining portions of industry include agriculture, construction, wholesale trade, transportation, information, finance, management, administration, arts and entertainment, food service, recreation, accommodation, and public administration.

Arts and culture

National Register of Historic Places
The Upson County courthouse was built in 1908, and is listed on the National Register of Historic Places.

 Pettigrew-White-Stamps House
 Silvertown Mill District

Annual events
Thomaston hosts an annual Emancipation Proclamation Celebration each May. It is the nation's oldest and longest running emancipation celebration of its kind.

Parks and recreation
 Sprewell Bluff Park, located on the Flint River
 The Greatest Generation Recreational Park

Education

Thomaston-Upson County School District 
The Thomaston-Upson County School District holds pre-school to grade twelve, and consists of two elementary schools, a middle school, and a high school. The district has 279 full-time teachers and over 5,009 students.
Upson-Lee Elementary School
Upson-Lee Primary School
Upson-Lee Middle School
Upson-Lee High School
Upson-Lee Pre-k
Upson-Lee Alternative School

Colleges and universities 
Southern Crescent Technical College is located in Thomaston, and is a two-year technical school.

Notable people

 Dr. John H. Carter - Led effort to create MLK Memorial in Washington DC
 Dallas Raines - Weather personality at KABC in Los Angeles
 Elia Goode Byington (1858–1936), journalist
 Kentavious Caldwell-Pope - shooting guard for the Los Angeles Lakers
 Mike Cavan - football player at Univ. of Ga. and former head coach at SMU
 Wayne Cochran - musician (Wayne Cochran and the C.C. Riders)
 Ivylyn Girardeau - medical missionary in Pakistan
 John Brown Gordon - one of Robert E. Lee's most trusted Confederate generals during the American Civil War; governor of Georgia 1886-1890
 Frank Gordy (1904-1983) - founder of The Varsity restaurant chain
 William Guilford (1844–1909) - businessman and state legislator
 Bill Hartman - football running back for the Georgia Bulldogs and Washington Redskins before World War II
 John Holliman - broadcast journalist best known as one of CNN's "Boys of Baghdad" during the first Persian Gulf War
 Marion Montgomery - poet, novelist, educator, and critic; close friend and critic of Flannery O'Connor
 Cedric Smith - African American painter
 Coy Bowles - Grammy award-winning country artist Zac Brown Band
 Travon Walker- 1st overall pick in the 2022 NFL draft, selected by the Jacksonville Jaguars

References

External links
 
 Official City of Thomaston, Georgia Government Website Portal style website, Government, Business, Library, Recreation and more
 City-Data.com Comprehensive Statistical Data and more about Thomaston

Cities in Georgia (U.S. state)
Micropolitan areas of Georgia (U.S. state)
Cities in Upson County, Georgia
County seats in Georgia (U.S. state)
1825 establishments in Georgia (U.S. state)